Keeping Fit is a 1942 American short film made by Universal Pictures about the importance of keeping fit in war time. It is noticeable for its cast which includes Lon Chaney Jr., Robert Stack, Andy Devine, Dick Foran and Broderick Crawford, all of whom were under contract to Universal.

It was directed by Arthur Lubin.

Plot

Cast
Robert Stack as Bob - Factory Worker
Broderick Crawford as Brod - Factory Worker
Andy Devine as Andy - Factory Worker
Anne Gwynne as Nurse
Irene Hervey as Irene - Dick's Wife
Lon Chaney Jr. as Lon - Factory Worker
Dick Foran as Dick
Louise Allbritton as Miss Allbritton
Don Porter as Don - Co-worker
Ralph Morgan as Dr. Morgan - Factory Doctor
Mary Wickes as Ann - Andy's wife
Russell Hicks as Plant Manager
Mary Gordon as Mary - Irene's Friend
Susan Levine Susie - Irene and Dick's Girl

References

External links
Keeping Fit at IMDb
Keeping Fit at Letterbox DVD
Complete film at YouTube

1942 films
Films directed by Arthur Lubin
American black-and-white films